Stephen Young (born 7 June 1969) is a British professional stock car racing driver. He last competed part-time in the Xfinity Series, driving the No. 78 Chevrolet Camaro for B. J. McLeod Motorsports.

Racing career

Xfinity Series

Young made his Xfinity debut at Watkins Glen, driving the No. 78 car for B.J. McLeod Motorsports. He started 39th and finished 36th after a transmission failure. Young drove again for the team at Mid-Ohio. He started 37th and finished 24th, which was a significant improvement on his last race. He drove once again at Road America, starting 36th and finishing 34th, 3 laps down.

Motorsports career results

NASCAR
(key) (Bold – Pole position awarded by qualifying time. Italics – Pole position earned by points standings or practice time. * – Most laps led. ** – All laps led.)

Xfinity Series

Whelen Euro Series – Elite 2

 Season still in progress
 Ineligible for series points

References

External links
 
 

Living people
NASCAR drivers
1969 births
English racing drivers
Sportspeople from Newcastle upon Tyne